Nanhua Dam, originally named Houjie Dam, is a dam across the Houku River, a tributary of the Zengwen River in southern Taiwan. Located at Nanhua District, Tainan, the dam was built to provide municipal water to Tainan and Kaohsiung City and is operated by the Taiwan Water Corporation. Construction work started in December 1988, and impoundment of the reservoir began in July 1993. A conduit to supply water from the reservoir to Kaohsiung was completed in October 1993 and the entire project was operational in March 1994.

Most of the water is actually diverted through a tunnel from the Qishan River to the east, adding  to the drainage area. The tunnel provides an average of 160.6 million m3 (130,200 acre feet) of water to the reservoir each year.

Because of its location in a mountainous region, Nanhua is prone to heavy sediment accumulation. A small upstream diversion weir was built to send water laden with silt through a bypass tunnel and allow the remaining clear water to enter the reservoir. However, large amounts of silt are still carried into the reservoir during flooding events. In 2009 alone, flooding caused by Typhoon Morakot dumped 17 million m3 (14,000 acre feet) of silt into the reservoir. In February 2010, the Taiwan Water Corporation began the first stage of a two-year sediment removal project at Nanhua.

See also
List of dams and reservoirs in Taiwan
Zengwun Dam

References

1994 establishments in Taiwan
Dams completed in 1994
Dams in Tainan
Earth-filled dams